The Olympus M.Zuiko Digital ED 14–42 mm f/3.5-5.6 is a Micro Four Thirds System lens by Olympus Corporation. It is sold as a standalone item, and also as part of a kit along with bodies for all cameras in the Olympus PEN series (the discontinued E-P1 and the current E-P2, E-PL1, and E-PL2).
The lens is available in black or silver.

External links 
 Official Webpage
 http://www.four-thirds.org/en/microft/lense.html#lens_14-42mmF3.5-5.6
 https://www.olympus.com.ru/site/ru/archived_products/cameras_1/accessories/m_zuiko_digital_ed_14_42mm_1_3_5_5_6/index.pdf

References

14-42mm F3.5-5.6
Camera lenses introduced in 2009